Oppenheimer is a surname.

Oppenheimer may also refer to:

Physical sciences
 Oppenheimer (crater)
 Oppenheimer Diamond, a large yellow diamond named for Sir Ernest Oppenheimer

Arts and entertainment
 Oppenheimer (TV series), a 1980 BBC serial about J. Robert Oppenheimer
 Oppenheimer (band), an indie-pop electronica duo from Belfast, Northern Ireland
 Oppenheimer (album), their debut album
 Oppenheimer (play), 2015 play
 Oppenheimer (film), a 2023 film

Businesses
 Oppenheimer Holdings, of Toronto, Ontario
 Oppenheimer & Co., a global investment bank, and a division of Oppenheimer Holdings
 Oppenheimer Funds, acquired by Massachusetts Mutual Life Insurance Company, a New York mutual fund

See also
 Oppenheim (disambiguation)